The Gibraltar National Netball team represents Gibraltar in international netball. They are also known as the Gibraltar Netball Campions.

References

 Official webpage

National netball teams of Europe
National sports teams of Gibraltar